The Hanna Formation is a geologic formation in Wyoming. It preserves fossils dating back to the Torrejonian to Tiffanian stages of the Paleogene period.

See also 
 List of fossiliferous stratigraphic units in Wyoming
 Paleontology in Wyoming

References

Further reading 
 C. S. Scott and R. C. Fox. 2005. Windows on the evolution of Picrodus (Plesiadapiformes: Primates): morphology and relationships of a species complex from the Paleocene of Alberta. Journal of Paleontology 79(4):635-657
 R. Secord. 1998. Paleocene mammalian biostratigraphy of the Carbon Basin, southeastern Wyoming, and age constraints on local phases of tectonism. Rocky Mountain Geology 33(1):119-154
 J. A. Lillegraven. 1994. Age of upper reaches of Hanna Formation, northern Hanna Basin, south-central Wyoming. Berliner geowissenschaftliche Abhandlungen E (Paläobiologie) 13:203-219

Paleogene geology of Wyoming
Selandian Stage
Thanetian Stage
Tiffanian
Torrejonian
Paleontology in Wyoming